Elisha Beebe Strong (Nov. 29, 1788-Oct. 14, 1867) was an American lawyer and politician.

Strong, son of Elisha and Mary Strong, was born in Windsor, Conn., Nov. 29, 1788.  He graduated from Yale College in 1809.  He studied law at the Litchfield Law School, and subsequently in Canandaigua, N. Y., where he was admitted to the bar in 1812, and commenced practice in partnership with Win. H. Adams, Esq. In 1816 he purchased, jointly with Elisha Beach, Esq., one thousand acres of land in the vicinity of Rochester, N. Y., and removed to that place. In 1819-20 he was a member of the New York State Legislature from Ontario County, and after the organization of Monroe County, in 1821, he was appointed first Judge of the County Court. His sons having settled in the West, Judge Strong moved to Detroit in 1851, and there spent the rest of his life.  He married, June 24, 1813, Dolly G., daughter of Nathaniel and Mary (Chaffee) Hooker of Windsor. Shortly after his removal to Detroit, he married Miss Ellen O'Keefe, who survived him.  He died in Detroit, Mich., after a brief illness, Oct. 14th, 1867, aged 79 years.

External links
 Litchfield Ledger

1788 births
1867 deaths
People from Windsor, Connecticut
Lawyers from Detroit
Yale College alumni
Litchfield Law School alumni
New York (state) state court judges
Members of the New York State Assembly
19th-century American politicians
19th-century American judges
19th-century American lawyers